North Guardian Glacier is located on east slopes of Glacier Peak in the U.S. state of Washington. As is true with all the glaciers found on Glacier Peak, North Guardian Glacier is retreating. Since then North Guardian Glacier resumed retreating and thinning and by 2005 the glacier had returned to its minimum length as recorded in 1946.

See also
List of glaciers in the United States

References

Glaciers of Glacier Peak
Glaciers of Washington (state)